Rebecca Frayn  is an English documentary film maker, screenwriter, novelist and actress.

Career

Rebecca Frayn is a film maker and screen writer. She has directed a wide variety of quirky documentary essays for the BBC, Channel 4 and ITV on subjects that range from Tory Wives to the Friern Barnet Mental Asylum and identical twins.

She played the role of June in the 1979 TV movie One Fine Day, directed by Stephen Frears and starring Robert Stephens and Dominic Guard. She appeared uncredited as the photograph image by Denis O'Regan of Liam Neeson's character's dead wife, Joanna, in the film Love Actually (2003), directed by Richard Curtis.
 
She made her drama debut as a director with Whose Baby? for ITV, a TV drama that tackled father's rights, starring Sophie Okonedo and Andrew Lincoln. A screenplay she wrote for the BBC, Killing Me Softly explored the true story of Sara Thornton, whose conviction for murder helped bring about a reform of the law on domestic violence. She has written and/or directed a number of films about prominent women, including Leni Riefenstahl, Annie Leibovitz and Nora Ephron. Her screenplay about Aung San Suu Kyi, The Lady, directed by Luc Besson and starring Michelle Yeoh and David Thewlis was awarded the Amnesty International Human Rights Film Award in 2011.

Her first novel, One Life, dealt with the complex emotional and ethical landscape of IVF. Her second novel, Deceptions, is a psychological thriller, inspired by a true story; it explores the impact on a family when a child goes missing.

After making a short film in 2008 opposing the proposed expansion of London Heathrow Airport, Frayn co-founded We CAN, a group who lobbied the government to take action on climate change in the run up to the 2010 Copenhagen Conference.

Frayn wrote the screenplay for the 2020 film Misbehaviour, that deals with the controversy surrounding the 1970 Miss World competition, and the birth of feminism.

Personal life 

The daughter of playwright and novelist Michael Frayn and his first wife, Gillian (née Palmer), Frayn grew up in North West England. She graduated from the University of Bristol in 1984. She married film producer Andy Harries in July 1992 and they have three children: twin sons, Jack Harries and Finn Harries, and a daughter Emmy. Frayn had to undergo IVF to have her daughter, an experience which inspired her novel One Life. She has served as chair of Turnham Green Friends, a group that helps to care for the park of that name in Chiswick.

Credits

As novelist

As drama director

As documentary director

As documentary producer

As screen writer

As actress

References

External links
 
 
 Rebecca Frayn at SimonAndSchuster.com
 Rebecca Frayn speech at Intelligence Squared

Living people
1962 births
English documentary filmmakers
English women film directors
English television writers
British women screenwriters
English screenwriters
English women novelists
Women documentary filmmakers
British women television writers